The Mapiripán massacre was a massacre of civilians that took place in Mapiripán, Meta Department, Colombia.  The massacre was carried out from July 15 to July 20, 1997, by the United Self-Defense Forces of Colombia (AUC), an outlawed right-wing paramilitary group.

On July 12, 1997, two planeloads of paramilitaries arrived at the airport of San José del Guaviare, which also served as a base for anti-narcotics police.  The paramilitaries then traveled through territories where the Colombian National Army operated checkpoints. 

On July 15, 1997, the paramilitaries arrived at Mapiripán. They used chainsaws and machetes to murder, behead, dismember, and disembowel a number of civilians.  Because the bodies were thrown into a river, it is unknown exactly how many people died but the U.S. State Department claimed in 2003 that at least 30 civilians were killed. 

In proceedings before the Inter-American Court of Human Rights, the government of Colombia  admitted that members of its military forces also played a role in the massacre, through omission. General Jaime Uscátegui allegedly ordered local troops under his command to stay away from the area in which the murders were taking place until the paramilitaries finished the massacre and left. Retired General Uscátegui was later prosecuted, put on trial, and subsequently acquitted.
On 25 November 2009, the Superior Tribunal of Bogotá revoked the previous sentence, and condemned General Uscátegui to 40 years in prison.

Convictions
Jaime Humberto Uscategui, a former army general who had ignored calls for help during the massacre, was arrested in 1999. His trial took place in a military court and he was given forty months in prison for "omission" in 2001.

On 25 November 2009, the Bogotá superior tribunal announced in a ruling of ninety pages that it had passed a forty-year prison sentence on 61-year-old General Uscategui. It was the longest sentence that had ever been given to an army officer in Colombia's history. Uscategui was found guilty of kidnapping, murder, and falsifying public documents. He declared his innocence, saying "I have the tranquillity of innocence and I also have the tranquillity of proof".

Colonel Hernán Orozco, the batallian commander accused of failing to stop the massacre, was also given a forty-year sentence for murder in 2007.

Carecuchillo surrender 
One of the paramilitary leaders allegedly responsible for the massacre, Dumas de Jesús Castillo Guerrero, a.k.a. "Carecuchillo", surrendered to authorities on May 20, 2008, after having been considered dead for half a year.

See also
List of massacres in Colombia
War on Drugs

References

External links
Case of the "Mapiripán Massacre" v. Colombia. Judgment on Merits, Reparations and Costs Inter-American Court of Human Rights,  September 15, 2005. 

Conflicts in 1997
Mass murder in 1997
Massacres in 1997
Massacres in Colombia
Political repression in Colombia
1997 in Colombia
Colombian conflict
Meta Department
Inter-American Court of Human Rights cases
July 1997 events in South America